Ruscova is a commune in Maramureș County, Maramureș, Romania. It is composed of a single village, Ruscova.

References

Communes in Maramureș County
Localities in Romanian Maramureș
Ukrainian communities in Romania